Dr. Tushar Govindrao Rathod is an Indian politician. He was elected to the Maharashtra Legislative Assembly from Mukhed in the 2014 Maharashtra Legislative Assembly election (by poll) for first time and again in 2019 Maharashtra Legislative Assembly election as a member of Bharatiya Janata Party.

References 

1979 births
Living people
Bharatiya Janata Party politicians from Maharashtra
People from Nanded district
Maharashtra MLAs 2019–2024
Maharashtra MLAs 2014–2019